The 1977 Copa Interamericana was a two-legged football match contested between 1977 Copa Libertadores champion Boca Juniors and 1977 CONCACAF Champions' Cup champion Club América. It was the 6th edition of the competition.

Organized by the Confederation of North, Central American and Caribbean Association Football (CONCACAF) and Confederación Sudamericana de Fútbol (CONMEBOL), the 1977 edition was played between March and April 1978. In the first leg, held in La Bombonera in Buenos Aires, Boca Juniors won 3–0. In the second leg, held in Estadio Azteca in Mexico City, América beat Boca Juniors 1–0. Despite Boca Juniors had a goal difference of 3–1, it was not taken into account and a playoff match had to be played. Agreed by both clubs, it was held in Estadio Azteca again, where América beat Boca Juniors 2–1 to win the series 4–2 on points, achieving their first Copa Interamericana title.

Qualified teams

Venues

Matches

First leg

Second leg

Playoff

References

1977
i
i
i
1978 in Argentine football
Football in Buenos Aires